Lake Lavine is a small lake, in south central Michigan.

Lake Lavine is a deep lake (84 feet maximum) with steep drop-offs. Speed boats are allowed during the hours of 10:00 am until 6:30 pm. On the southeastern shore there is a state-operated public fishing site with a paved boat ramp. The terrain surrounding Lake Lavine is gently rolling woodlands, wetlands, farm fields, and vineyards. Approximately half of the shoreline is developed, with about 60 summer and permanent homes on the lake. The remaining shoreline is wetlands and undeveloped woodland. The lake is primarily groundwater seepage fed, without any significant inlet and no outlet. Lake Lavine is within the headwaters of the Prairie River watershed. The Prairie River (Michigan) flows westerly, joining the St. Joseph River just south of the community of Three Rivers. Almost half of the lakeshore is privately owned wetlands with no immediate plans for development. This lakes claim to fame is that John Dillinger hid here in until he was found and executed.

Known for its exceptional fishing, Lake Lavine holds significant numbers of perch, bass, bluegill and crappie. It was formally stocked by MDNR with rainbow trout. This was stopped in 2009 after illegal release of northern pike diminished the native habitat.

See also
List of lakes in Michigan

References

External links
Michigan Department of Natural Resources
Fishingworks.com
Trailstrotrout.com

Bodies of water of Branch County, Michigan
Lavine